Enteromius lukindae is a species of ray-finned fish in the genus Enteromius which has only been recorded from a tributary of the Lukinda River, South Katanga in the Democratic Republic of the Congo.

Footnotes 

 

Enteromius
Taxa named by George Albert Boulenger
Fish described in 1915
Endemic fauna of the Democratic Republic of the Congo